Bangladesh Jatiyatabadi Krishak Dal is the farmers wing of the Bangladesh Nationalist Party.

History 
President Ziaur Rahman established Bangladesh Jatiyatabadi Krishak Dal on 30 December 1980. The first convening committee was led by Justice Abdus Sattar.

In 1992, Abdul Mannan Bhuiyan and Shamsuzzaman Dudu were appointed the president and general secretary of Bangladesh Jatiyatabadi Krishak Dal.

On 16 May 1998, Bangladesh Jatiyatabadi Krishak Dal committee was formed with Mahbubul Alam Tara as president and Shamsuzzaman Dudu as general secretary. Tara joined Awami League and Mojibur Rahman was appointed the President. After Rahman's death, Mirza Fakhrul Islam Alamgir, was appointed president.

Bangladesh Jatiyatabadi Krishak Dal held its biennial conference in October 2003 in Nilphamari District. The conference was attended by the President of Bangladesh Jatiyatabadi Krishak Dal Mozibur Rahman, Asadul Habib Dulu, Mirza Fakhrul Islam Alamgir, and Shahrin Islam Tuhin. The criticised Awami League and called former President Hussain Mohammad Ershad an emigrant from India and not a "son of the soil".

In 2007, the president and organizing secretary of Khulna District unit of Bangladesh Jatiyatabadi Krishak Dal was arrested by Bangladesh Army.

Mokhlesur Rahman Bacchu, Bangladesh Jatiyatabadi Krishak Dal politician, joined Awami League with 200 followers in 2015; he was facing charged of burning a police station in January 2014. The secretary, Shamsuzzaman Dudu, of the dal was arrested in April 2015. The Vice President of Krishak Dal Khagrachhari District unit, Nazrul Islam, was killed in December.

In 2016, Bangladesh Jatiyatabadi Krishak Dal convener from Jessore District, Kamrul Hasan Nasim, tried to create a splinter faction Bangladesh Nationalist Party called Ashol (real) BNP. In January, Bangladesh Jatiyatabadi Krishak Dal organized an event protesting the filing of a sedition case against by former Prime Minister Khaleda Zia.

Bangladesh Nationalist Party formed the new convening committee, which has 153 members, of Bangladesh Jatiyatabadi Krishak Dal after a pause of 21 years with Shamsuzzaman Dudu as convener in February 2019. It organized protests demanding the release of Bangladesh Nationalist Party chairperson Khaleda Zia. It dissolved the national committee and created a new one for Bangladesh Jatiyatabadi Krishak Dal in 2021. There was some tensions over Hasan Jafir Tuhin bringing in supporters from Pabna during the conference using four buses. Hasan Jafir Tuhin was made the president and Shahidul Islam Babul was appointed the general secretary of Jatiyatabadi Krishak Dal. A 231 member committee was created for the Dal.

Jatiyatabadi Krishak Dal leader Salah Uddin Khan filed a case against police officers and Awami League activists over the death of a Jatiyatabadi Jubo Dal activist Shahidul Islam in September 2022.

References 

Organisations based in Dhaka
Bangladesh Nationalist Party
Nationalism in Asia
1980 establishments in Bangladesh
Agricultural organisations based in Bangladesh